Series 8 of Top Gear, a British motoring magazine and factual television programme, was broadcast in the United Kingdom on BBC Two during 2006, consisting of eight episodes that were aired between 7 May and 30 July; because of the 2006 FIFA World Cup, the series took a month-long hiatus between its fifth and sixth episodes. This series saw the programme receive a brand new opening title sequence, a brand new studio, and a brand new car for the "Star in a Reasonably Priced Car". Throughout the series, the show also saw Richard Hammond bringing along one of his dogs for episodes, which would have small appearances in films in the following series.

This series' highlights included the presenters attempting to make amphibious cars, setting an indoor speed record with a F1 car, and conducting challenges as van drivers. A film shown in this series received several complaints, which led to Jeremy Clarkson admitting that some of its content was staged for a publicity stunt.

Production
In early 2006, production of Top Gear began to outgrow the old studio that had been used for the past seven series, leading the BBC to look for a bigger site for the eighth series. Plans were put underway to shift the film site from Dunsfold to Enstone, Oxfordshire, but while negotiations were underway, West Oxfordshire council received concerns from locals who feared the move would increase noise and air pollution at the proposed site, and thus blocked the initial application for the move. The BBC thus decided against the move and went ahead with filming at the old site after revamping and expanding the studio set, despite not having a permit to do so.

In addition, the programme also opted for changing the vehicle it used for its celebrity segment, the Suzuki Liana, with a newer model for the new series. Its replacement, the Chevrolet Lacetti, meant that the Celebrity Lap Board had to be wiped clean, as the new vehicle differed in speed and performance, whilst the format of the segment was revised - celebrities would be given training over a few laps, then conduct a timed lap that would be recorded, rather than taking the best time of their practice lap. Although the Liana was replaced, it was retained for later episodes for use by F1 drivers, until the end of the twenty-second series.

Episodes

Criticism
The eighth series saw Top Gear receive criticism over its film featuring the presenters undertaking a caravanning holiday, which focused on the final scene of their caravan catching fire. Clarkson commented about the complaints during the following episode, before proclaiming that it had not been an 'accident' as first implied, but a publicity stunt to show everyone how much Top Gear hates caravans.

References

2006 British television seasons
Top Gear seasons